The Cross House was a historic house at 410 South Main Street in Beebe, Arkansas.  It was a -story L-shaped wood-frame structure, with a cross-gable roof and novelty siding.  The front-facing gable had a pair of sash windows with pedimented gables.  A porch, with a shed roof supported by Doric columns, stood at the crook of the L.  The house was built about 1900, and was one White County's few surviving L-shaped houses from that period.

The house was listed on the National Register of Historic Places in 1992.  It has been listed as destroyed in the Arkansas Historic Preservation Program database, and was delisted in 2018.

See also
National Register of Historic Places listings in White County, Arkansas

References

Houses on the National Register of Historic Places in Arkansas
Houses completed in 1900
Houses in White County, Arkansas
National Register of Historic Places in White County, Arkansas
Buildings and structures in Beebe, Arkansas
Former National Register of Historic Places in Arkansas
Demolished buildings and structures in Arkansas
1900 establishments in Arkansas